DJ-Kicks: Kamaal Williams is a DJ mix album, mixed by British musician and producer Kamaal Williams. It was released 15 November 2019 under the Studio !K7 independent record label as part of their DJ-Kicks series.

Critical reception
DJ-Kicks: Kamaal Williams was met with generally favourable reviews from critics. At Metacritic, which assigns a weighted average rating out of 100 to reviews from mainstream publications, this release received an average score of 77, based on 4 reviews.

Track listing

References

2019 compilation albums
DJ-Kicks albums